Aquarius National Forest was established as the Aquarius Forest Reserve by the General Land Office in 
In 1905 federal forest lands were transferred to the U.S. Forest Service. On March 4, 1907, it became a National Forest, and on July 1, 1908, it was renamed Powell National Forest. The lands are presently included in Dixie National Forest. The forest included the Aquarius Plateau to the southeast of Capitol Reef National Park.

References

External links
Forest History Society
Listing of the National Forests of the United States and Their Dates (from Forest History Society website) Text from Davis, Richard C., ed. Encyclopedia of American Forest and Conservation History. New York: Macmillan Publishing Company for the Forest History Society, 1983. Vol. II, pp. 743–788.

Former National Forests of Utah